The Lady of the Veil is a 1949 Mexican drama film directed by Alfredo B. Crevenna and starring Libertad Lamarque, Armando Calvo and Ernesto Alonso. The film's art direction was by Jesús Bracho.

The film is the first of five productions that Lamarque made with Crevenna, followed by Otra primavera (1950), Huellas del pasado (1950), La mujer sin lágrimas (1951), and Si volvieras a mi (1954).

Plot
Andrea del Monte (Libertad Lamarque) is a singer who falls in love with Esteban Navarro (Armando Calvo), a failed actor who is also alcoholic and married. In a fit of rage, Esteban ends up killing his wife. Unable to relinquish her feelings for him, Andrea decides to go to prison to visit Esteban, but aware of the risk of ruining her reputation in such an act, she uses a veil to hide her identity. Esteban's defense attorney, Cristóbal (Ernesto Alonso), desires to find out who that mysterious lady is.

Cast
Libertad Lamarque as Andrea del Monte
Armando Calvo as Esteban Navarro
Ernesto Alonso as Lic. Cristobal Gómez Peña
José Baviera as Prosecutor
Bárbara Gil as Lolita - Laura Camarena
Tana Lynn as Teresa
Juan Pulido as School Principal
Miguel Córcega as Víctor Gómez Peña
María Gentil Arcos as Andrea's assistant
Armando Velasco as Police detective
José María Pedroza
Héctor López Portillo as Waiter
Ignacio Peón as Judge
Joaquín Roche as Prison guard
Héctor Mateos as Waiter
Carmen Cabrera as Minister's wife (uncredited)
Enrique Carrillo as Police officer (uncredited)
Julio Daneri as Minister (uncredited)
Irma Dorantes as Party guest (uncredited)
Pedro Elviro as Man in court (uncredited)
José Escanero as Juvenile court judge (uncredited)
Leonor Gómez as Woman in court (uncredited)
Ana María Hernández as Party guest (uncredited)
Ismael Larumbe (uncredited)
Margarito Luna as Member of the jury (uncredited)
Consuelo Monteagudo as Party guest (uncredited)
Salvador Quiroz as Impresario (uncredited)
Hernán Vera (uncredited)

Production
Filming of the movie took place at Estudios Churubusco. Lamarque recorded the music and songs for the film after recovering from a throat condition.

References

External links

1949 drama films
1949 films
Mexican drama films
Films directed by Alfredo B. Crevenna
1940s Mexican films